Live Fast, Die Young is a 1958 American film noir crime film directed by Paul Henreid and starring Mary Murphy, Norma Eberhardt, Sheridan Comerate and Mike Connors. Considered a cult film, promotional campaigns used the tagline "a sin-steeped story of the rise of the Beat Generation."

Plot
Two sisters, Kim Winters (Murphy) and Jill Winters (Eberhardt) run away from their home and school. They escape to the city, where they become criminals and jewelry thieves.

Cast
 Mary Murphy as Kim Winters / narrator
 Norma Eberhardt as Jill Winters
 Sheridan Comerate as Jerry
 Mike Connors as Rick (as Michael Connors)
 Peggy Maley as Sue Hawkins
 Jay Jostyn as Fred Knox
 Troy Donahue as Artie Sanders / Artie Smith
 Carol Varga as Violet
 Joan Marshall as Judy Tobin
 Gordon Jones as Pop Winters 
 Dawn Richard as Mona
 Jamie O'Hara as Mary

Production
Its working title was Seed of Violence. Troy Donahue was borrowed from Universal Pictures to play his role.

Legacy
A cult classic, Norma Eberhardt noted that, "The film tapped into what kids were feeling – that society sucked and they were rebelling against it." Screenshots of Eberhardt were printed onto T-shirts worn by Slash, the guitarist of Guns N' Roses, in 2007. Eberhardt was described as "highly amused" by Slash's wardrobe.

See also
 List of American films of 1958

References

External links
 
 
 

1958 films
Films directed by Paul Henreid
Film noir
1958 crime drama films
American crime drama films
Universal Pictures films
1950s English-language films
1950s American films